The Solar Orbiter (SolO) is a Sun-observing satellite developed by the European Space Agency (ESA). SolO, designed to obtain detailed measurements of the inner heliosphere and the nascent solar wind, will also perform close observations of the polar regions of the Sun which is difficult to do from Earth. These observations are important in investigating how the Sun creates and controls its heliosphere. 

SolO makes observations of the Sun from an eccentric orbit moving as close as ≈60 solar radii (RS), or 0.284 astronomical units (au), placing it inside Mercury's perihelion of 0.3075 au. During the mission the orbital inclination will be raised to about 24°. The total mission cost is US$1.5 billion, counting both ESA and NASA contributions.

SolO was launched on 10 February 2020. The mission is planned to last seven years.

Spacecraft
The Solar Orbiter spacecraft is a Sun-pointed, three-axis stabilised platform with a dedicated heat shield to provide protection from the high levels of solar flux near perihelion. The spacecraft provides a stable platform to accommodate the combination of remote-sensing and in situ instrumentation in an electromagnetically clean environment. The 21 sensors were configured on the spacecraft to allow each to conduct its in situ or remote-sensing experiments with both access to and protection from the solar environment. Solar Orbiter has inherited technology from previous missions, such as the solar arrays from the BepiColombo Mercury Planetary Orbiter (MPO). The solar arrays can be rotated about their longitudinal axis to avoid overheating when close to the Sun. A battery pack provides supplementary power at other points in the mission such as eclipse periods encountered during planetary flybys.

The Telemetry, Tracking and Command Subsystem provides the communication link capability with the Earth in X-band. The subsystem supports telemetry, telecommand and ranging. Low-Gain Antennas are used for Launch and Early Orbit Phase (LEOP) and now function as a back-up during the mission phase when steerable Medium- and High-Gain Antennas are in use. The High-Temperature High-Gain Antenna needs to point to a wide range of positions to achieve a link with the ground station and to be able to downlink sufficient volumes of data. Its design was adapted from the BepiColombo mission. The antenna can be folded in to gain protection from Solar Orbiter's heat shield if necessary. Most data will therefore initially be stored in on-board memory and sent back to Earth at the earliest possible opportunity.

The ground station at Malargüe (Argentina), with a  antenna, is used for 4 to 8 hours/day (effective). ESA's Malargüe ground station will be used for all operations throughout the mission with the ground stations in New Norcia, Australia, and Cebreros, Spain, acting as backup when necessary.

Mission operations

During nominal science operations, science data is downlinked for eight hours during each communication period with the ground station. Additional eight-hour downlink passes are scheduled as needed to reach the required total science data return of the mission. The Solar Orbiter ground segment makes maximum reuse of ESA's infrastructure for Deep Space missions:

 The ground stations, which belong to ESA's space tracking station network (ESTRACK)
 The Mission Operations Centre (MOC), located at ESOC, Darmstadt, Germany
 The Science Operations Centre (SOC), located at ESAC, Villanueva de la Cañada, Spain
 The communications network, linking the various remotely located centres and stations to support the operational data traffic

The Science Operations Centre was responsible for mission planning and the generation of payload operations requests to the MOC, as well as science data archiving. The SOC has been operational for the active science phase of the mission, i.e. from the beginning of the Cruise Phase onwards. The handover of payload operations from the MOC to the SOC is performed at the end of the Near-Earth Commissioning Phase (NECP). ESA's Malargüe Station in Argentina will be used for all operations throughout the mission, with the ground stations of New Norcia Station, Australia, and Cebreros Station, Spain, acting as backup when necessary.

During the initial cruise phase, which lasted until November 2021, Solar Orbiter performed two gravity-assist manoeuvres around Venus and one around Earth to alter the spacecraft's trajectory, guiding it towards the innermost regions of the Solar System. At the same time, Solar Orbiter acquired in situ data to characterise and calibrate its remote-sensing instruments. The first close solar pass took place on 26 March 2022 at around a third of Earth's distance from the Sun.

The spacecraft's orbit has been chosen to be 'in resonance' with Venus, which means that it will return to the planet's vicinity every few orbits and can again use the planet's gravity to alter or tilt its orbit. Initially, Solar Orbiter will be confined to the same plane as the planets, but each encounter of Venus will increase its orbital inclination. For example, after the 2025 Venus encounter, it will make its first solar pass at 17° inclination, increasing to 33° during a proposed mission extension phase, bringing even more of the polar regions into direct view.

Scientific objectives
The spacecraft makes a close approach to the Sun every six months. The closest approach will be positioned to allow a repeated study of the same region of the solar atmosphere. Solar Orbiter will be able to observe the magnetic activity building up in the atmosphere that can lead to powerful solar flares or eruptions.

Researchers will also have the chance to coordinate observations with NASA's Parker Solar Probe mission (2018-2025) which is performing measurements of the Sun's extended corona.

The objective of the mission is to perform close-up, high-resolution studies of the Sun and its inner heliosphere. The new understanding will help answer these questions:

 How and where do the solar wind plasma and magnetic field originate in the corona?
 How do solar transients drive heliospheric variability?
 How do solar eruptions produce energetic particle radiation that fills the heliosphere?
 How does the solar dynamo work and drive connections between the Sun and the heliosphere?

Instruments
The science payload is composed of 10 instruments:

Heliospheric in-situ instruments (4)

 SWA – Solar Wind Plasma Analyser (United Kingdom): Consists of a suite of sensors that measures the ion and electron bulk properties (including density, velocity, and temperature) of the solar wind, thereby characterizing the solar wind between 0.28 and 1.4 au from the Sun. In addition to determining the bulk properties of the wind, SWA provides measurements of solar wind ion composition for key elements (e.g. the C, N, O group and Fe, Si or Mg)
 EPD – Energetic Particle Detector (Spain): Measures the composition, timing and distribution functions of suprathermal and energetic particles. Scientific topics to be addressed include the sources, acceleration mechanisms, and transport processes of these particles
 MAG – Magnetometer (United Kingdom): Provides in situ measurements of the heliospheric magnetic field (up to 64Hz) with high precision. This will facilitate detailed studies into the way the Sun's magnetic field links into space and evolves over the solar cycle; how particles are accelerated and propagate around the Solar System, including to the Earth; how the corona and solar wind are heated and accelerated
 RPW – Radio and Plasma Waves (France): Unique amongst the Solar Orbiter instruments, RPW makes both in situ and remote-sensing measurements. RPW measures magnetic and electric fields at high time resolution using a number of sensors/antennas, to determine the characteristics of electromagnetic and electrostatic waves in the solar wind

Solar remote-sensing instruments (6)

 PHI – Polarimetric and Helioseismic Imager (Germany): Provides high-resolution and full-disk measurements of the photospheric vector magnetic field and line-of-sight (LOS) velocity as well as the continuum intensity in the visible wavelength range. The LOS velocity maps have the accuracy and stability to allow detailed helioseismic investigations of the solar interior, in particular of the solar convection zone high-resolution and full-disk measurements of the photospheric magnetic field
 EUI – Extreme Ultraviolet Imager (Belgium): Images the solar atmospheric layers above the photosphere, thereby providing an indispensable link between the solar surface and outer corona that ultimately shapes the characteristics of the interplanetary medium. Also, EUI provides the first-ever UV images of the Sun from an out-of-ecliptic viewpoint (up to 33° of solar latitude during the extended mission phase)
 SPICE – Spectral Imaging of the Coronal Environment (France): Performs extreme ultraviolet imaging spectroscopy to remotely characterize plasma properties of the Sun's on-disk corona. This will enable matching in situ composition signatures of solar wind streams to their source regions on the Sun's surface
 STIX – Spectrometer Telescope for Imaging X-rays (Switzerland): Provides imaging spectroscopy of solar thermal and non-thermal X-ray emission from 4 to 150 keV. STIX provides quantitative information on the timing, location, intensity, and spectra of accelerated electrons as well as of high-temperature thermal plasmas, mostly associated with flares and/or microflares
Metis – Coronagraph (Italy): Simultaneously images the visible and far ultraviolet emissions of the solar corona and diagnoses, with unprecedented temporal coverage and spatial resolution, the structure and dynamics of the full corona in the range from 1.4 to 3.0 (from 1.7 to 4.1) solar radii from Sun centre, at minimum (maximum) perihelion during the nominal mission. This is a region that is crucial in linking the solar atmospheric phenomena to their evolution in the inner heliosphere
 SoloHI – Solar Orbiter Heliospheric Imager (United States): Images both the quasi-steady flow and transient disturbances in the solar wind over a wide field of view by observing visible sunlight scattered by solar wind electrons. SoloHI provides unique measurements to pinpoint coronal mass ejections (CMEs). (NRL provided)

Institutions involved 
The following institutions operate each instrument:
 Solar Wind Plasma Analyser (SWA): Mullard Space Science Laboratory
 Energetic Particle Detector (EPD): University of Alcala, University of Kiel (CAU)
 Magnetometer (MAG): Imperial College London
 Radio and Plasma Waves (RPW): Observatoire de Paris
 Polarimetric and Helioseismic Imager (PHI): Max Planck Institute for Solar System Research (MPS), Instituto de Astrofísica de Andalucía (IAA)
 Extreme Ultraviolet Imager (EUI): Royal Observatory of Belgium, Centre Spatial de Liège, Institut d'astrophysique spatiale, Max Planck Institute for Solar System Research (MPS)
 Spectral Imaging of the Coronal Environment (SPICE): Institut d'astrophysique spatiale Rutherford Appleton Laboratory, Max Planck Institute for Solar System Research (MPS)
 Spectrometer/Telescope for Imaging X-rays (STIX): FHNW, Space Research Centre of Polish Academy of Sciences, Leibniz-Institut für Astrophysik Potsdam (AIP)
 Coronagraph (Metis): University of Florence, INAF, Max Planck Institute for Solar System Research (MPS)
 Heliospheric Imager (SoloHI): United States Naval Research Laboratory

Launch and flight

Launch delays 

In April 2015, the launch was set back from July 2017 to October 2018. In August 2017, Solar Orbiter was considered "on track" for a launch in February 2019. The launch occurred on 10 February 2020 on an Atlas V 411.

Launch 
The Atlas V 411 (AV-087) lifted off from SLC-41 at Cape Canaveral, Florida, at 04:03 UTC. The Solar Orbiter spacecraft separated from the Centaur upper stage nearly 53 minutes later, and the European Space Agency acquired the first signals from the spacecraft a few minutes later.

Trajectory 
After launch, Solar Orbiter will take approximately 3.5 years, using repeated gravity assists from Earth and Venus, to reach its operational orbit, an elliptical orbit with perihelion 0.28 AU and aphelion 0.91 AU. The first flyby was of Venus in December 2020. Over the expected mission duration of 7 years, it will use additional gravity assists from Venus to raise its inclination from 0° to 24°, allowing it a better view of the Sun's poles. If an extended mission is approved, the inclination could rise further to 33°.

During its cruise phase to Venus, Solar Orbiter passed through the ion tail of Comet C/2019 Y4 (ATLAS) from 31 May to 1 June 2020. It passed through the comet's dust tail on 6 June 2020.

In June 2020, Solar Orbiter came within  of the Sun, and captured the closest pictures of the Sun ever taken.

Mission timeline 

 April 2012: €319 million contract to build orbiter awarded to Astrium UK
 June 2014: Solar shield completes 2 week bake test
 September 2018: Spacecraft is shipped to IABG in Germany to begin the environmental test campaign
 February 2020: Successful launch
 May-June 2020: Encounter with the ion and dust tails of C/2019 Y4 (ATLAS)
Jul 2020: First images of the Sun released
March 2022: highest resolution image of the Sun’s full disc and outer atmosphere, the corona, ever taken
September 2022: Solar Orbiter solves the magnetic switchback mystery

See also 

 
 
 
 
 
  
 
 
 
 Ulysses spacecraft
 WIND spacecraft

References

External links

 New ESA Solar Orbiter homepage (from December 2020)
 Old ESA Solar Orbiter homepage (to December 2020)
 Special issue on "The Solar Orbiter Mission" in Astronomy & Astrophysics
 Solar Orbiter at eoPortal
 METIS instrument homepage
 Media Kit - overview of mission

Missions to the Sun
European Space Agency space probes
Solar space observatories
NASA space probes
Solar telescopes
Space probes launched in 2020
Living With a Star
Cosmic Vision
Spacecraft launched by Atlas rockets
February 2020 events in the United States